Proselotis is a genus of moth in the family Gelechiidae.

Species
 Proselotis apicipunctella (Stainton, 1859)
 Proselotis ischnoptila (Turner, 1919)
 Proselotis sceletodes (Meyrick, 1914)
 Proselotis strictula (Meyrick, 1937)

References

 
Anomologini